Benthenchelys cartieri is an eel in the family Ophichthidae. It was described by Henry Weed Fowler in 1934. It is a tropical, marine eel known from the Philippines, in the western central Pacific Ocean. It is known to dwell at a maximum depth of 1168 m, and inhabits the pelagic zone.

References

Ophichthidae
Fish described in 1934